West Flintshire was a parliamentary constituency in Flintshire, North Wales.  It returned one Member of Parliament (MP) to the House of Commons of the Parliament of the United Kingdom.

The constituency was created for the 1950 general election, and abolished for the 1983 general election.

Boundaries 
The Urban Districts of Mold, Prestatyn, and Rhyl, and the Rural Districts of Holywell and St Asaph.

Members of Parliament

Election results

Elections in the 1950s

Elections in the 1960s

Elections in the 1970s

References 

History of Flintshire
Historic parliamentary constituencies in North Wales
Constituencies of the Parliament of the United Kingdom established in 1950
Constituencies of the Parliament of the United Kingdom disestablished in 1983